Jinabhadra or Vachanacharya Jinabhadragani Kshamashramana was Jain ascetic author of Prakrit and Sanskrit texts.

Life
Jinabhadra (520-623 AD) was a Svetambara Jain monk during sixth-seventh century CE. Not much is known about his life but it seems that he traveled in western parts of India. He belonged to Nirvruttikula branch of Jainism and was head of several monks. He was at Vallabhi during the reign of Maitraka king Shiladitya I in 609 CE (Saka Samvat 531). He had knowledge of Jain canonical texts as well as the other philosophical systems prevalent in India.

Works
He restored Mahanishitha, a canonical text, in Mathura. He wrote several Prakrit texts; Brihatsangrahani, Briharkshetrasamasa, Visheshanavati, Visheshavashyaka Bhashya, Dhyanashataka, Jitkalpa Sutra and its Bhashya. Sanskrit commentary on Visheshavashyaka remained unfinished.

Jinabhadra elaborated the Debate with the Ganadharas, a work associated with the literature on Avasyakasutra which has achieved quasi autonomous status. According to this text, the learned Brahmin Gautama summoned the gods to a great sacrifice but instead they flew off to hear Mahāvīra preaching at his second samavasarana near by. In fury, Gautama confronted Mahavira in debate, as did ten other brahmins in succession, with the fordmaker converting them all by a demonstration, underpinned by his claim to omniscience.

Notes

References
 
 

Indian Jain writers
520s births
620s deaths
Prakrit literature
Indian Jain monks
6th-century Indian Jains
6th-century Jain monks
6th-century Indian monks
7th-century Indian Jains
7th-century Jain monks
7th-century Indian monks
Śvētāmbara monks